Johnny Gibson (born 23 December 1950) is an English former footballer, who played for Partick Thistle, Ayr United, St Mirren, Celtic, East Fife, Forfar Athletic and Stirling Albion in the Scottish Football League. Gibson was part of the Partick Thistle team that won the 1971–72 Scottish League Cup, defeating Celtic 4–1 in the cup final.

References

1950 births
Living people
Footballers from Kingston upon Hull
English footballers
Association football wingers
Scottish Football League players
Partick Thistle F.C. players
Ayr United F.C. players
St Mirren F.C. players
Celtic F.C. players
East Fife F.C. players
Forfar Athletic F.C. players
Stirling Albion F.C. players
Sauchie F.C. players
Anglo-Scots